I.O.I (also known as IOI or Ideal of Idol) was a South Korean girl group formed by CJ E&M through the 2016 reality show Produce 101 on Mnet. The group was composed of eleven members chosen from a pool of 101 trainees from various entertainment companies: Jeon So-mi, Kim Se-jeong, Choi Yoo-jung, Kim Chung-ha, Kim So-hye, Zhou Jieqiong, Jung Chae-yeon, Kim Do-yeon, Kang Mi-na, Lim Na-young and Yoo Yeon-jung. They debuted on May 4, 2016, with the EP Chrysalis and actively promoted as a whole and as a sub-unit for less than a year.

The group's concert titled Time Slip – I.O.I, which was held on January 20 to 22, 2017, marked their last group activity on stage. They officially disbanded at the end of January 2017 and returned to their respective agencies.

History

Pre-debut: Produce 101 and "Crush"

In November 2015, Mnet announced their new survival show that would bring together 101 trainees from 46 entertainment companies to form a unit girl group with eleven members chosen by the viewers. The show premiered on January 21, 2016, and ended on April 1, 2016.

Prior to Produce 101, some of the members of I.O.I gained recognition after appearing on other television shows: Kim Se-jeong was a contestant on competition show K-pop Star 2 in 2012, Jeon So-mi was a member of the 2015 reality survival show Sixteen, and Choi Yoo-jung appeared in the web drama To Be Continued. In September 2015, Jung Chae-yeon debuted as a member of DIA but temporarily withdrew from the group to join Produce 101. She also had a cameo appearance in the 2015 web drama Sweet Temptation.

It was initially planned for the group to debut on April 1, 2016, with the song "Crush," which they performed as part of the finale of the show, but YMC Entertainment and Mnet decided to postpone the debut to better prepare the group's concept and choreography with a new song as I.O.I's debut single. Its genre was referred to as "Trapical Dutch Funk".

On April 3, 2016, a representative gave details of the plans for the debut of the group. Instead of releasing a digital single as initially planned, I.O.I would be releasing an EP with various songs. It was also reported that the group would have their own reality show on Mnet. On the same day, the members greeted the fans for the first time as I.O.I via their official Naver V app channel.

Debut with Chrysalis

I.O.I officially debuted on May 4, 2016, through the release of their first album, Chrysalis, accompanied with a music video for the title track "Dream Girls". The song is a trap pop dance track co-written by Eru and Paul with rap lyrics written by members Lim Na-young and Choi Yoo-jung. On May 5, the group held their debut stage on Mnet's M Countdown, performing the title track and "Knock Knock Knock". On the same day, the group held their debut showcase and fan meeting at Jangchung Gymnasium in Seoul.

"Whatta Man" and "Hand in Hand"

On June 10, 2016, YMC Entertainment revealed Lim Na-young, Chungha, Zhou Jieqiong, Kim So-hye, Choi Yoo-jung, Kim Do-yeon and Jeon So-mi as members of I.O.I's unit group, slated to promote the group's second album during the summer of 2016.  Jung Chae-yeon joined her MBK Entertainment group DIA for a comeback, Kim Se-jeong and Kang Mi-na were preparing for their debut as members of Jellyfish Entertainment's girl group Gugudan at the time, and Yoo Yeon-jung was added into Starship Entertainment's girl group WJSN for their second comeback.

On August 9, 2016, the sub-unit released a single titled "Whatta Man (Good Man)". The song was inspired by Linda Lyndell's "What a Man" and was produced by Ryan S. Jhun who also composed I.O.I's song "Crush". The choreography for "Whatta Man" was arranged by member Chungha.

On August 15, 2016, I.O.I released the digital single "Hand in Hand", a remake of the Seoul 1988 Summer Olympics theme song originally sung by Koreana.

Miss Me?

On October 17, 2016, I.O.I released their extended play titled Miss Me?. The title track, "Very Very Very", was written, composed and arranged by Park Jin-young, founder of Jeon So-mi's agency JYP Entertainment. With a rhythm of 206 bpm, the upbeat and energetic song is one of the fastest that Park has ever made. The group's special comeback show titled I Miss You Very Very Very Much Show was aired live through Mnet on October 16, 2016, followed by the release of Miss Me? and the title track's music video at midnight.

I.O.I received their first music program trophy as a whole group with "Very Very Very" on Show Champion on October 26.

Last activities, final concert and disbandment
On November 5, 2016, YMC Entertainment confirmed that I.O.I would be disbanding on January 31, 2017. The group would still be actively promoting until the end of their contracts; including guest appearance on variety shows such as Immortal Songs: Singing the Legend, Yang and Nam Show and Knowing Bros. From January 20 to 22, 2017, I.O.I held their final concert titled Time Slip – I.O.I. The three-day concert was held in Jangchung Gymnasium, where the group held their debut showcase.

On January 10, 2017, it was revealed that I.O.I had received songs from various producers and songwriters as potential songs for their final release, including B1A4's Jinyoung. On January 17, YMC Entertainment announced that the group's final track before official disbandment would be "Downpour", written and co-produced by Seventeen's Woozi. The ballad was personally chosen and recorded by all eleven members of the group. The digital single and its music video was released the next day at midnight.

I.O.I's last schedule as a group was on January 25, 2017. They filmed a new CF for school uniform brand Elite along with boy group Pentagon. The band officially disbanded on January 29, with the members' last television show appearance on MBC's Section TV and the fan cafe closing down on the 31st. It was also announced on January 31 that I.O.I's song "Downpour" won Inkigayo'''s final January 2017 trophy with no live broadcast due to Lunar New Year's Day.

Planned reunion
On July 1, 2019, Studio Blu confirmed that the group would return in October 2019 with nine members, excluding Yoo Yeon-jung and Jeon So-mi. On September 6, the planned comeback was postponed to December. On October 29, the comeback was canceled due to scheduling conflicts between the members and the ongoing Mnet vote manipulation investigation. On May 4, 2021, the 5th anniversary of the group's debut, the group (except for Mina and Jieqiong) held a reunion livestream. Jieqiong managed to join the livestream via video calling.

Members
 Lim Na-young – leader
 Kim Chung-ha
 Kim Se-jeong
 Jung Chae-yeon
 Zhou Jieqiong
 Kim So-hye
 Yoo Yeon-jung
 Choi Yoo-jung
 Kang Mi-na
 Kim Do-yeon
 Jeon So-mi

Sub-unit
 I.O.I sub-unit – Nayoung, Chungha, Jieqiong, Sohye, Yoojung, Doyeon and Somi

Discography
Extended plays

Singles

Promotional singles

Soundtrack appearances

Other charted songs

Compilation appearances

Videography
Music videos

Concert
 Time Slip – I.O.I (2017)

Filmography
Reality shows
 Produce 101 (2016)
 Standby I.O.I (2016)
 LAN Cable Friends I.O.I (2016)
 I Miss You Very Very Very Much Show (2016)

Endorsements
It was reported on March 24, 2016, that even before the finale of Produce 101, the group already confirmed seven CF deals for different companies with an estimated profit of ₩1.4 billion.

On April 4, 2016, I.O.I was appointed as new model for Etude House, Mom's Touch Chicken and Burger, Woongjin Foods' Haneul Bori Ice Sparkling Water and HiteJinro's Chamisul. However, due to the legal drinking age in South Korea, only three members, Lim Na-young, Chungha and Kim Se-jeong, were involved in filming of the ad for a new alcoholic beverage by distiller HiteJinro.

On April 11, 2016, I.O.I was chosen as the advertising model for mobile games from Netmarble, 100 Shots 100 Hits and StoneAge''. They also sang the OST of the games. The next day, the group was confirmed as the new endorser for SK Telecom, South Korea's largest wireless carrier.

I.O.I also endorsed CJ CheilJedang's dessert brand Petitzel Eclairs and Korean fashion brand Pancoat.

On May 25, 2016, I.O.I was appointed as the promotional models for KB Kookmin Bank, one of the largest banks in South Korea. On June 7, 2016, the group was chosen as the exclusive models of online marketplace Auction.

On August 18, 2016, school uniform brand Elite announced their collaboration with I.O.I and Pentagon as their new models.

Awards and nominations

Listicles

References

External links

  

 
K-pop music groups
Musical groups established in 2016
Swing Entertainment artists
South Korean girl groups
South Korean dance music groups
South Korean pop music groups
Musical groups from Seoul
Singing talent show winners
Produce 101
Produce 101 contestants
2016 establishments in South Korea
MAMA Award winners
Musical groups disestablished in 2017
2017 disestablishments in South Korea